Diuraphis tritici, the western wheat aphid, is a wheat pest native to North America. The aphid can also live on Bromus marginatus.

References

Aphididae
Insect pests of wheat
Hemiptera of North America